Ballads is an album by Canadian jazz pianist Paul Bley recorded in 1967 and released on the ECM label in 1971.

Reception
The Allmusic review by Eugene Chadbourne awarded the album 2½ stars stating "Ballads, which really seems to make ballads out of ballads, has been considered both worthy of hanging on the museum wall alongside the other masterpieces and being accorded special merit as the jazz record most used for background music... What all this adds up to, when not shoved to the background of the listener's psyche, is a beautiful sound indeed, this album being one of several that helped establish the entire concept of the divine "ECM sound," despite actually being one of Bley's own productions... Surely it was fun making this album, but it has not proven to be an album that is that much fun to really listen to. Perhaps the music's magic is marred by the excessive echo and pristine recording quality, or maybe the playing is simply pretentious. A decision can be made at the end of the recording, if the listener is still awake".

Track listing
All compositions by Annette Peacock
 "Ending" - 17:15   
 "Circles" - 3:10   
 "So Hard It Hurts" - 12:12  
Recorded in New York City on March 31, 1967 (tracks 2 & 3) and July 28, 1967 (track 1).

Personnel
 Paul Bley — piano 
 Gary Peacock (track 1) — bass
 Mark Levinson (tracks 2 & 3) — bass
 Barry Altschul   — drums

References

ECM Records albums
Paul Bley albums
1971 albums
Albums produced by Manfred Eicher